Climate change in Illinois encompasses the effects of climate change, attributed to man-made increases in atmospheric carbon dioxide, in the U.S. state of Illinois.

The United States Environmental Protection Agency reports:

"Illinois's climate is changing. Most of the state has warmed by about one degree (F) in the last century. Floods are becoming more frequent, and ice cover on the Great Lakes is forming later or melting sooner. In the coming decades, the state will have more extremely hot days, which may harm public health in urban areas and corn harvests in rural areas". In May 2019, The Kansas City Star noted that although it was not yet possible to say whether climate change was contributing to the increasing number of tornadoes in the region, "the band of states in the central United States ... that each spring are ravaged by hundreds of tornadoes — is not disappearing. But it seems to be expanding", resulting in a higher frequency of tornadoes in states including Illinois. In 2015, The Washington Post reported that "by the end of the century... Chicago could become a lot like today’s Texas, having even more days per year above 95 degrees than the Lone Star State currently does".

Heavy precipitation and flooding

"Changing climate is likely to increase the frequency of floods in Illinois. Over the last half century, average annual precipitation in most of the Midwest has increased by 5 to 10 percent. But rainfall during the four wettest days of the year has increased about 35 percent, and the amount of water flowing in most streams during the worst flood of the year has increased by more than 20 percent. During the next century, spring rainfall and average precipitation are likely to increase, and severe rainstorms are likely to intensify. Each of these factors will tend to further increase the risk of flooding".

Illinois, Ohio, and Mississippi Rivers

"Flooding occasionally threatens both navigation and riverfront communities, and greater river flows could increase these threats. In 2011, a combination of heavy rainfall and melting snow caused a flood that closed the Ohio and Mississippi rivers to navigation and prompted evacuation of Cairo due to concerns that its flood protection levees might fail. To protect Cairo, the U.S. Army Corps of Engineers opened the Birds Point-New Madrid Floodway, which lowered the Mississippi River by flooding more than 100,000 acres of farmland in Missouri. The flood caused $360 million of damage to infrastructure, property, and agricultural yields upstream".

"Although springtime in Illinois is likely to be wetter, summer droughts are likely to be more severe. Higher evaporation and lower summer rainfall are likely to reduce river flows. The drought of 2012 narrowed navigation channels, forced lock closures, and caused dozens of barges to run aground along the Illinois shoreline of the Mississippi River, all of which delayed shipping. The Corps of Engineers estimates that the drought’s impact on navigation cost the region more than $275 million. Both floods and drought can cause problems for the Illinois Waterway, which carries 25 million tons of cargo per year between Chicago and the Mississippi River".

Great Lakes

"The ice-free season along the Great Lakes is also becoming longer. Between 1994 and 2011, reduced ice cover lengthened the shipping season on the lakes by eight days. The Great Lakes are likely to warm another 3° to 7°F in the next 70 years, which will further extend the shipping season".

"In Lake Michigan, changing climate is likely to harm water quality. Warmer water tends to cause more algal blooms, which can be unsightly, harm fish, and degrade water quality. Severe storms also increase the amount of pollutants that run off from land to water, so the risk of algal blooms will be greater if storms become more severe. Increasingly severe rainstorms could also cause sewers to overflow into the lake more often, threatening beach safety and drinking water supplies".

Agriculture

"Changing climate will have both beneficial and harmful effects on farming. Longer frost-free growing seasons and higher concentrations of atmospheric carbon dioxide would increase yields for some crops during an average year. But increasingly hot summers are likely to reduce yields of corn and possibly soybeans. Seventy years from now, southern Illinois is likely to have 15 to 20 more days with temperatures above 95°F than it has today. More severe droughts or floods would also hurt crop yields".

See also
 List of U.S. states and territories by carbon dioxide emissions
 Plug-in electric vehicles in Illinois

References

Further reading
 —this chapter of the National Climate Assessment covers Midwest states (Illinois, Indiana, Iowa, Michigan, Minnesota, Missouri, Ohio, and Wisconsin).

Illinois
Climate of Illinois